Caroline Garcia was the defending champion, but lost in the second round to Wang Yafan. 

Rebecca Peterson won the title, defeating Heather Watson in the final, 6–4, 6–4.

Seeds

Draw

Finals

Top half

Bottom half

Qualifying

Seeds

Qualifiers

Lucky losers

Draw

First qualifier

Second qualifier

Third qualifier

Fourth qualifier

References

External links
Main Draw
Qualifying Draw

Tianjin Open - Singles
Tianjin Open